Paul Behncke (13 August 1869 – 4 January 1937) was a German admiral during the First World War, most notable for his command of the III Battle Squadron of the German High Seas Fleet during the Battle of Jutland.

Naval career
He was born in Lübeck in 1869. At the age of fourteen he joined the navy and as an officer commanded a gunboat in the Far East. After studying at the Naval Academy in Kiel he was assigned to the general staff. As commander of the unprotected cruiser , he returned to Chinese waters and on being promoted to the rank of captain he was appointed to the battleship , and afterwards to the dreadnought .

Shortly before the outbreak of the First World War Behncke was promoted to Konteradmiral (Rear Admiral) and again assigned to the general staff. Leading these ships aboard his flagship , Behncke took part in the Battle of Jutland, where he was seriously wounded by a shell splinter and found himself in command of the whole fleet during the third phase of the action.

By that time he had the rank of Vizeadmiral (Vice Admiral) and the following year, after the renunciation of Admiral Eduard von Capelle, rose to Secretary of State of the Imperial Naval Office, a position he held for only one month before being relieved.

Behncke regained office after the war, replacing admiral Adolf von Trotha, and retired from the navy in 1924. In retirement, Behncke served as the president of the German-Japanese Society. He died in Berlin in 1937.

References

Enciclopedia General del Mar, Jose Mª Martinez - Hidalgo, Volume I, s.v. BEHNCKE, Paul, Page 1323, Ediciones Garriga, S.A., Barcelona, 1968

External links
 

Imperial German Navy admirals of World War I
Vice admirals of the Imperial German Navy
Recipients of the Pour le Mérite (military class)
1937 deaths
1869 births
People from Ostholstein
People from the Province of Schleswig-Holstein
Military personnel from Lübeck
Admirals of the Reichsmarine
Recipients of the Iron Cross (1914), 1st class
Recipients of the Hanseatic Cross (Lübeck)